Lou Lepori or Pierre Lepori (Lugano, Switzerland, 1968) is a Swiss translator and writer in Italian and French.

He studied in the universities of Siena and Bern (Dr. Degree in drama). Lepori was editor for the Theaterlexikon der Schweiz, and a journalist in Lausanne for the Swiss Radio and for the literacy yearbook Viceversa Letteratura. He has translated works by French writers like Claude Ponti, Monique Laederach and Gustave Roud to Italian. He received the Swiss Schiller Prize for Poetry in 2004. He is founder and editor of the review Hétérographe: revue des homolittératures ou pas (queer literature & critics). Pierre Lepori's novel 'Sexuality' has an unusual publishing history: it was launched simultaneously in three languages: Italian, French and German. The author did his own translation from Italian to French, and the German translator based her version on the two "originals". In addition, there is a trilingual version that switches between all three languages, depending on which character is speaking."Lepori points here to a very interesting connection: that between literary genre and gender as opposing and separate categories to be contaminated and actively connected to each other. The process of creolization, and hybridization affects the identity of the writer, the body of the text as well as its position within the traditional territories of literary genres. Literary polyphony questions and abolishes clear-cut borders across a whole series of metaphorically interlinked areas" (Rainer Guldin, Flusserstudies, 22, December 2016).

Engl.: Wathever The Name, poems, translated by Peter Valente, New York City, Spuyten Duyvil, 2017
Engl.: Almonst Love, poems, translated by Peter Valente, Toronto, Guernica Editions, 2022
Qualunque sia il nome, poems, introduction by Fabio Pusterla, Bellinzona, Casagrande, 2003
Vento, introduction by Stefano Raimondi, Faloppio, LietoColle Libri, 2004.
Grisù, novel, Bellinzona, Casagrande, 2006.
Alberto Canetta. La traversata del teatro, essay, Bellinzona, Casagrande, 2007.
Il teatro nella Svizzera italiana. La generazione dei fondatori (1932-1987), essay, Bellinzona, Casagrande, 2008.
Quel que soit le nom, poems, Lausanne, Editions d'en bas, 2011 (French translation by Mathilde Vischer).
Sexualité, novel, Lausanne, Editions d'en bas, 2011 (French).
Sessualità, Bellinzona, Edizioni Casagrande, 2011 (Italian).
Sexualität, Biel, Verlag die Brotsuppe, 2011 (German translation by Jacqueline Aerne).
Sans peau, novel, Lausanne, Editions d'en bas, 2013 (French).
Strade bianche, poems, Novara, Interlinea, 2013 (Italian).
Come cani, novel, Milano, Edizioni Effigie, 2015 (Italian).
Comme un chien, novel, Lausanne, Editions d'en bas, 2015(French).
Nuit américaine, novel, Lausanne, Editions d'en bas, 2018(French).
Quasi amore, poems, Bellinzona, Edizioni Sottoscala, 2018(Italian).
Klaus Nomi Projekt, theatre, Lausanne, Editions Humus, 2018(French).
Effetto notte, novel, Milano, Edizioni Effigie, 2019(Italian).
Le Théâtre de Luigi Pirandello, essai, Lausanne, Editions Ides & Calendes, 2020(French).

References 

 Spuyten Duyvil
 Solothurner Literaturtage
 Viceversa Literatur
 Revue Hétérographe
 Territory Crossings
 Pro Helvetia
 Swissliterature

External links
Official Website
 
Bibliothèque Universitaire de Lausanne
Hétérographe

1968 births
Living people
Gay novelists
Swiss LGBT novelists
Swiss translators
Swiss male novelists
21st-century Swiss novelists
21st-century male writers
21st-century translators